Luisa Menárguez was a Spanish harpist and educator, who taught several of the world's premier harpists of modern times, including Marisa Robles, Nicanor Zabaleta,  and Maria del Milagro Azpiazu.  She has been listed as among the great harpists Spain produced in the 20th century, alongside Isabel Espeso, Luisa Pequeño, María Dolores Huigueras, Rosa Bacells, María Luisa Sánchez, María Carmen Alvira, Ángeles Domínguez, José Adolfo Vayá and María Rosa Calvo Manzano. 

Spanish classical harpists